Scott Reef may refer to:

 Scott Reefs northwest of Australia, see Scott and Seringapatam Reefs
 A reef close to Sala y Gomez, a remote Pacific island belonging to Chile